Malvern or Malverne may refer to:

Places

Australia
 Malvern, South Australia, a suburb of Adelaide
 Malvern, Victoria, a suburb of Melbourne
 City of Malvern, a former local government area near Melbourne
 Electoral district of Malvern, an electoral district in Victoria

England
 Malvern, Worcestershire, a spa town and civil parish
 Malvern Hills, a ridge of hills on the boundary of Herefordshire and Worcestershire

United States
 Malvern, Alabama, a town
 Malvern, Arkansas, a city
 Malvern, Illinois, an unincorporated community in Whiteside County, Illinois
 Malvern, Iowa, a city
 Malverne, New York, a village
 Malvern, Ohio, a village
 Malvern, Pennsylvania, a borough
 Malvern, Wisconsin, an unincorporated community

Elsewhere
 Malvern, Barbados, a town in the parish of Saint Joseph
 Malvern, Jamaica, a village in the parish of Saint Elizabeth
 Malvern, Gauteng, a suburb of Johannesburg, South Africa
 Malvern, New Zealand, a village now called Sheffield
 Malvern, Toronto, a neighbourhood in Toronto, Ontario, Canada

Education
 Malvern College, a coeducational independent school in Malvern, Worcestershire, England
 Malvern College Egypt, a British international school in Cairo, Egypt
 Malvern Collegiate Institute, a high school in Toronto, Canada
 Malvern High School (disambiguation)
 Malvern Preparatory School, an independent Catholic middle and high school for boys in Pennsylvania, US

Other uses
 Malvern (surname), a surname
 Malvern (Charlottesville, Virginia), a historic home and farm in the US
 Malvern Instruments, a manufacturer and supplier of laboratory analytical instruments
 USS Malvern, the name of four US Navy ships
 Viscount Malvern, a title in the Peerage of the UK
 Malvern station (disambiguation), stations with the name

See also
 Malvern Festival (disambiguation)
 Malvern Water (bottled water)